Seid Memić, known by his stage name Vajta, (born 8 March 1950, in Travnik, Bosnia and Herzegovina) is a Bosnian singer and the vocalist for the Yugoslav rock band Teška industrija ("Heavy Industry").

In 1973, Vajta moved to Sarajevo and that is when his music career begins in earnest. From 1975 to 1976 he was a vocalist for Teška Industrija, who enjoyed great commercial success throughout the Balkan countries but later dissolved.

Soon, though, Vajta left the band to start a career as a pop singer. In the years from 1979-85, the albums "Zlatna Ribica" (Goldfish), "Vajta 2 Ponoćni valcer" (Midnight Waltz), "Tebi pjevam" (Singing to You) and "Kad bulbuli pjevaju" (When Bulbuls Sing) brought him to the heights of popularity throughout former Yugoslavia and made him a household name.

He became internationally known in the 1981 Eurovision Song Contest during which he represented Yugoslavia.  He achieved 15th place for Yugoslavia with the song "Lejla", which became a hit and still is throughout the Balkan countries.

He hosted Nedeljni zabavnik kids programme in the 1980s.

With the breakout of the Bosnian war, he moved to Germany, settling in Hamburg, where he lives today.

In early 2007, Teška Industrija reunited and released a new album.

In 2009, Vajta attained popularity by participating in the Croatian reality TV show Farma, where he was expelled in the 6th duel on April 10.

References

1950 births
Living people
People from Travnik
Bosniaks of Bosnia and Herzegovina
Yugoslav musicians
Eurovision Song Contest entrants for Yugoslavia
Eurovision Song Contest entrants of 1981
Bosnia and Herzegovina rock singers
20th-century Bosnia and Herzegovina male singers
Bosnia and Herzegovina emigrants to Germany